Keith Morgan may refer to:

Keith Morgan (judoka) (born 1973), Canadian Olympic judoka
Keith N. Morgan, American architectural historian
Junior Kelly (Keith Morgan, born 1969), Jamaican reggae artist
Keith Morgan (footballer) (born 1940), footballer with Swindon Town